Graham John Yost (born September 5, 1959) is a Canadian film and television screenwriter. His best-known works are the films Speed, Broken Arrow, and Hard Rain and the TV series Justified.

Early life, family and education
Yost was born in Etobicoke in the Toronto metropolitan area. He is the son of Canadian television personality Elwy Yost, the longtime host of the public broadcaster TVOntario's Saturday Night at the Movies. 

He graduated from the University of Toronto Schools and Trinity College at the University of Toronto.

Career
Yost wrote for the TV sitcom Herman's Head and the HBO miniseries Band of Brothers. In 2002, he created the television drama series Boomtown. He created the short-lived NBC drama Raines (2007). Yost teamed with Tom Hanks and Steven Spielberg, along with two of his fellow Boomtown writers Michelle Ashford and Larry Andries, to write and direct episodes of the HBO miniseries The Pacific. Yost is the creator and executive producer of the FX series Justified. He was an executive producer on the FX show The Americans. In 2016, he took over as head writer and executive producer of the Amazon Studios series Sneaky Pete. In May 2014, it was reported that Yost would develop a project for WGN America. Based on the Alex Kershaw book Avenue of Spies, it would be set in Nazi-occupied Paris at the start of World War II.

Awards and nominations
Yost won Emmy Awards for his involvement in the miniseries From the Earth to the Moon and The Pacific, which was also nominated for a Golden Globe Award. He also won a Golden Globe for his work on the HBO miniseries Band of Brothers, for which he was one of the writers.

Credits

Hey Dude (1989–1991) (story editor; wrote 13 episodes)
Herman's Head (1991) (wrote "The Last Boy Scout")
The Powers That Be (1992–1993) (4 episodes)
Speed (1994) (writer)
Broken Arrow (1996) (written by)
Speed 2: Cruise Control (1997) (characters)
Firestorm (1998) (rewrite)
Hard Rain (1998) (written by)
From the Earth to the Moon (1998) (supervising producer; wrote 2 episodes and directed "Spider")
Challenger (2000) (writer)
Mission to Mars (2000) (screenplay)
Planet of the Apes (2001) (uncredited co-writing)
Band of Brothers (2001) (wrote 2 episodes)
The Last Castle (2001) (screenplay)
Young Arthur (2002) (writer)
Boomtown (2002–2003) (series creator and executive producer; wrote 6 episodes)
Summerland (2004) (wrote "Skipping School")
Sixty Minute Man (2006) (writer)
Raines (2007) (series creator and executive producer; wrote "Pilot")
The Pacific (2010) (co-executive producer; directed and co-wrote "Gloucester/Pavuvu/Banika" with Robert Schenkkan)
Justified (2010–2015) (series creator and executive producer; wrote 12 episodes)
Falling Skies (2011) (executive producer; wrote "The Armory")
The Americans (2013–2018) (executive producer)
Sneaky Pete (2015–2018) (executive producer; wrote 7 episodes)
The Grizzlies (2018) (writer)
Slow Horses (2022) (executive producer)

References

External links

Graham Yost at filmreference.com

1959 births
Living people
Canadian male screenwriters
People from Etobicoke
Writers from Toronto
Trinity College (Canada) alumni
University of Toronto alumni
Canadian television writers
Canadian television producers
Showrunners
20th-century Canadian screenwriters
21st-century Canadian screenwriters
20th-century Canadian male writers
21st-century Canadian male writers